The national emblem of North Macedonia depicts two curved garlands of sheaves of wheat, tobacco leaves and opium poppy fruits, tied by a ribbon decorated with embroidery of traditional Macedonian folk motifs. In the center of the ovoid frame are depicted a mountain, a lake and a sunrise.  The features of the national coat of arms contain a rising sun which symbolizes freedom, the Šar Mountains with its peak named Ljuboten or Mount Korab and the river Vardar, with Lake Ohrid. The emblem also contains opium poppy fruits; this poppy was brought to the area during Ottoman times in the first half of the 19th century. Until 16 November 2009, the emblem also depicted a socialistic five-pointed star in the top. The national parliament adopted the proposal to remove this element with 80 votes in favor and 18 against. This emblem (including the red star) had been in use since 1946, shortly after the republic became part of Yugoslavia.

The emblem is based upon the emblem of Yugoslavia. Until 2009, along with Belarus and the disputed territory of Transnistria, North Macedonia was one of the few remaining European jurisdictions that continued to employ socialist symbolism in its national emblem.

History
The current emblem is a revised version of the one adopted on July 27, 1946 by the Assembly of the People's Republic of Macedonia. The original version of 1946 represented the Pirin Mountains, which are outside the country's territory, but part of the larger geographical region of Macedonia in order to symbolize a future "United Macedonia" as part of a new Balkan federation. The Emblem was created by Vasilije Popovic-Cico. After Yugoslavia broke with the Soviet Union in 1948, the Soviet Union did not compel Bulgaria and Albania to form a Balkan Federation with Yugoslavia and the concept of a United Macedonia as part of such a federation was no longer realistic.

Two days after its adoption, the symbolism of that device was described in the Nova Makedonija newspaper, as follows:

The supervised version was constitutionally approved by the Constitution of the People's Republic of Macedonia from December 31, 1946.

Proposed heraldic replacement

Between the 16th and the 19th centuries foreign armorials commonly represented the region of Macedonia by means of a golden lion on red field, or of a red lion on a golden field. The earliest known example is the Fojnica Armorial from 16th-17th century, and later examples include the Korenić-Neorić Armorial of 1595, a 1630 armorial on display in the Belgrade Museum of Contemporary Art, and a 17th-century armorial in Berlin Library.

On several occasions the reintroduction of the historical coat of arms has been proposed. A proposal by architect and graphic designer Miroslav Grčev was put forward in 1992 to replace it with a revised version of the historical gold lion on a red shield. The Macedonian Heraldry Society considers that coat of arms to have been the best solution for a new state emblem. However, this was rejected on three main grounds:
 several political parties, notably VMRO-DPMNE, already use that emblem as their party symbols
 the Albanian political parties of Macedonia considered the proposal to be only representative for the ethnic Macedonians, but not also for ethnic Albanians
 the state coat of arms of Bulgaria is identical to the Macedonian proposal save for the design of the crown.

As a result, the political parties have agreed to continue to use the current device until a replacement is found. The emblem did not appear on the country's first passports. In 2007, however, the national emblem was put on the front and the inside of the new biometric Macedonian passports, while the parliamentary debate about acceptance of a new national emblem still continues.

According to the provisions of the Article 5, Section 2 of North Macedonia's constitution, the two-thirds majority is required to pass a law on the new symbols of the Republic. The usage of the Coat of arms has been defined by a law.

2014 proposal 
On 5 December 2014, the Macedonian government proposed a heraldic design which would replace the old national emblem. According to the Macedonian Heraldry Society, the new coat of arms is based on an illustration from Jerome de Bara book "Coat of Arms" (1581). The illustration from de Bara's book "Le blason des armoiries" depicts a coat of arms attributed to Alexander the Great. It is blazoned as "Or, a lion gules" (on a golden background, a red lion) and topped with a golden mural crown to represent the republican form of government. Parliament still needs to vote on this design.

See also

 Flag of North Macedonia
 Emblems of the Yugoslav Socialist Republics

References

External links

North Macedonia
National symbols of North Macedonia
Macedonia
North Macedonia
North Macedonia
North Macedonia
North Macedonia
North Macedonia
North Macedonia